Joseph William George Tomlinson (born 9 June 2000) is an English professional footballer who plays for Peterborough United, as a full back.

Career
Tomlinson spent his early career with Southampton, Yeovil Town, Brighton & Hove Albion and Bognor Regis Town. He was released by Brighton at the end of the 2018–19 season. He then played for Hungerford Town, where he was appointed captain at the age of 19. He signed for Eastleigh in 2020, and Peterborough United in July 2021. He signed for Swindon Town on loan in January 2022. After impressing on loan at Swindon, Tomlinson was awarded the EFL Young Player of the Month award for February 2022, contributing with three assists and a goal across the month. In January 2023, Tomlinson re-signed for Swindon on loan until the end of the season with a view to a permanent transfer.

Honours
Individual
EFL Young Player of the Month: February 2022

References

2000 births
Living people
English footballers
Southampton F.C. players
Yeovil Town F.C. players
Brighton & Hove Albion F.C. players
Bognor Regis Town F.C. players
Hungerford Town F.C. players
Eastleigh F.C. players
Peterborough United F.C. players
Swindon Town F.C. players
English Football League players
Association football fullbacks